Sangrur (station code: SAG) is a railway station located in Sangrur district in the Indian state of Punjab and serves Sangrur city. Sangrur station falls under Ambala railway division of Northern Railway zone of Indian Railways.

The railway station 
This station is located on the single track,  broad gauge, Ludhiana–Jakhal line. It is well connected to a number of major cities.

Electrification 
Sangrur railway station tracks electrification was completed in year 2020. The electrification of 62 km long stretch of Dhuri–Jakhal on Ludhiana–Jakhal line was completed and trial runs were successfully carried out in July 2020. The station is located between Dhuri and Jakhal stations.

Amenities 
Sangrur railway station has computerized reservation counters, and all basic amenities like drinking water, public toilets, retiring room, sheltered area with adequate seating and an ATM. There is one foot overbridge connecting platforms.

References

External links 

 Pictures of Sangrur station

Railway stations in Sangrur district
Ambala railway division